Jane Steps Out is a 1938 British comedy film directed by Paul L. Stein and starring Diana Churchill, Jean Muir, Peter Murray-Hill and Athene Seyler.  There was a television remake on BBC in 1957.
It was also remade in India as the Hindi film Love in Simla (1960) that made Sadhana Shivdasani into a star.

Plot summary
A young woman is overshadowed by her more glamorous sister. With the help of her grandmother she transforms herself and is able to attract a man.

Cast
 Diana Churchill as Jane Wilton
 Jean Muir as Beatrice Wilton
 Peter Murray-Hill as Basil Gilbert
 Athene Seyler as Grandma
 Fred Emney as General Wilton
 Iris Hoey as Mrs Wilton
 Judy Kelly as Margot Kent

References

External links

1938 films
1938 comedy films
British comedy films
Films shot at Associated British Studios
Films directed by Paul L. Stein
British black-and-white films
1930s English-language films
1930s British films